José Sebastián Laboa Gallego (20 January 1923 – 24 October 2002) was a Spanish prelate of the Catholic Church who worked in the diplomatic service of the Holy See. Early in his career he held posts in the Roman Curia. He was also involved in Operation Nifty Package, convincing Panamian leader Manuel Noriega to surrender himself to American forces on 3 January 1990.

Biography
José Sebastián Laboa Gallego was born in Pasajes de San Juan, Spain, on 20 January 1923. He was ordained a priest on 16 April 1949. He earned a degree in theology at the Comillas Pontifical University of Madrid and a doctorate in canon law at the Pontifical Gregorian University. He worked in the Roman Curia where his assignments included stints as secretary to Cardinal Gaetano Cicognani and as the person responsible for Latin America at the Congregation for the Evangelization of Peoples.

On 18 December 1982, Pope John Paul II named him a titular archbishop and Apostolic Nuncio to Panama. He received his episcopal consecration from Pope John Paul on 6 January 1983.

On 21 August 1990, Pope John Paul appointed him Apostolic Nuncio to Paraguay.

On 18 March 1995, Pope John Paul named him Apostolic Nuncio to Malta and on 28 October Apostolic Delegate to Libya. He retired when replaced in these posts on 13 June 1998.

Laboa died on 24 October 2002 in San Sebastián.

References

External links
Catholic Hierarchy: Archbishop José Sebastián Laboa Gallego 

1923 births
2002 deaths
Pontifical Gregorian University alumni
Apostolic Nuncios to Panama
Apostolic Nuncios to Libya
Apostolic Nuncios to Malta
Apostolic Nuncios to Paraguay
Officials of the Roman Curia
People from Pasaia
Spanish expatriates in Italy
Spanish expatriates in Panama
Spanish expatriates in Paraguay
Spanish expatriates in Malta
Spanish expatriates in Libya
Basque Roman Catholic priests